Bangolan is a Grassfields Bantu language of Cameroon.

References

Languages of Cameroon
Nun languages